Ogryzkov (masculine) or Ogryzkova (feminine) is a Russian last name. Variants of this last name include Agryzkov/Agryzkova (/) and Ogryzko.

It derives from the nickname "" (Ogryzok)—phonetically spelled "" (Agryzok)—which derives from the dialectal Russian word "" (ogryza), meaning a rude fellow, someone giving cheek in response to any comments.

People with this last name
Alexander Ogryzkov, member of the Soviet Union national rugby union team

See also
Ogryzkovo, several rural localities in Russia
Agryzkovo, several rural localities in Tver Oblast, Russia

References

Notes

Sources
И. М. Ганжина (I. M. Ganzhina). "Словарь современных русских фамилий" (Dictionary of Modern Russian Last Names). Москва, 2001. 

Russian-language surnames
